Anacardium excelsum, the wild cashew or espavé, is a tree in the flowering plant family Anacardiaceae. The tree is common in the tropical and subtropical dry broadleaf forests of Pacific and Atlantic watersheds of Central and South America, extending as far north as Guatemala and south into Ecuador.

Description
Older flowers turn pink and develop a strong clove-like fragrance.

Maturation occurs in March, April, and May.

Taxonomy
The wild cashew is a closely related species within the same genus as the cashew (Anacardium occidentale).

Ecology
Fruit-eating bats pick the fruit of the wild cashew and transport it to their feeding places, where they eat only the fleshy part. The nuts are dropped into the leaf litter of the forest floor, where they later germinate.

Uses
When uncooked, the fruit (both the nut and the surrounding fleshy part) is highly toxic to humans. It may, however, be eaten after it is roasted.

References

Edible nuts and seeds
excelsum
Trees of Costa Rica
Trees of Honduras
Trees of Nicaragua
Trees of Panama
Trees of Venezuela
Trees of Colombia
Trees of Ecuador